The 2004 AFC Futsal Championship was held in Macau from 16 April to 25 April 2004.

Venue

Draw

Group stage

Group A

Group B

Group C

Group D

Knockout stage

Quarter-finals

Semi-finals

Third place play-off

Final

Awards

 Most Valuable Player
 Mohammad Reza Heidarian
 Top Scorer
 Vahid Shamsaei (33 goals)
 Fair-Play Award

References

 Futsal Planet
 RSSSF

AFC Futsal Championship
International association football competitions hosted by Macau
Afc Futsal Championship, 2004
Championship
International futsal competitions hosted by China